A visionary environment or fantasy world is a large artistic installation, often on the scale of a building or sculpture parks, intended to express a vision of its creator. The subjective and personal nature of these projects often implies a marginal status for the artists involved, and there is a strong association between visionary environments and outsider art.

List of visionary environments

 Jim Bishop: Bishop Castle (US)
 Aw Boon Haw (胡文虎) (sponsor/concept): Haw Par Villa (Singapore), Tiger Balm Garden (Hong Kong)
 Johann Michael Bossard: Kunststätte Bossard (Germany) 
 Peter Camani: Midlothian Castle (Screaming Heads) (Canada)
 Ferdinand Cheval: Le Palais idéal (France)
 Jean Cocteau: Chapelle Saint-Pierre à Villefranche-sur-Mer, Chapelle Sainte-Blaise des Simples de Milly-la-Forêt (France)
 María Ángeles Fernández Cuesta: Arguedas, Navarre environment (Spain)
 Samuel P. Dinsmoor: Garden of Eden (US)
 Lluís Domènech i Montaner: Palau de la Música Catalana (Spain)
 Kevin Duffy: Rectory Garden Centre, Tudor Village (UK) (official site)
 Howard Finster: Paradise Garden (US)
 Tom Every: Forevertron (US)
 Robert Garcet (French Wikipedia article): Tour d'Eben-Ezer (French Wikipedia article) (Belgium)
 Antoni Gaudí: Park Güell, Sagrada Família, Casa Batlló, Casa Milà, Casa Vicens (Spain)
 Randy Gilson: Randyland (US)
 Manfred Gnädinger: The Museum of the German (Spain)
 Annie Hooper: Bible Stories (US)
 Friedensreich Hundertwasser: Hundertwasserhaus (Austria), Quixote Winery (California), Waldspirale, Grüne Zitadelle von Magdeburg (German Wikipedia article) (Germany)
 Raymond Isidore: Maison Picassiette (French Wikipedia article) (France)
 Mollie Jenson: Art Exhibit (US)
 Karl Junker (German Wikipedia article): Junkerhaus (German Wikipedia article) (Germany)
 Sergei Kirillov (С.И.Кириллов): Kirillov's house (Russia)
 Leonard Knight: Salvation Mountain (US)
 George Paul Kornegay, near Brent, Alabama (US)
 Chalermchai Kositpipat (เฉลิมชัย โฆษิตพิพัฒน์): Wat Rong Khun (Thailand)
 Bill Lishman: Underground house (Canada)
 Helen Martins: The Owl House (South Africa)
 Đặng Việt Nga: Hằng Nga Guesthouse (Vietnam)
 Mary Nohl Art Environment (US)
 Eddie Owens Martin: Pasaquan (US)
 Pirro Ligorio: Gardens of Bomarzo (Italy)
 Tressa Prisbrey: Bottle Village (US)
 Simon Rodia: Watts Towers (US)
 Nek Chand Saini (नेक चंद सैणी): Rock Garden of Chandigarh (India)
 Niki de Saint Phalle: The Garden of Tarot (Italy)
 Jules Senis: Jardin Rosa Mir (French Wikipedia article) (France)
 Vollis Simpson: Windmill Park (US)
 Bunleua Sulilat (บุญเหลือ สุรีรัตน์): Buddha Park (Laos), Sala Keoku (Thailand)
 Robert Tatin (French Wikipedia article): Musée Robert Tatin (France) 
 Kea Tawana: Ark (US)
 Billy Tripp: The Mindfield (US)
 Lek Viriyaphant (เล็ก วิริยะพันธุ์) (sponsor/concept): Sanctuary of Truth, Erawan Museum, Ancient Siam (Thailand)
 Jacques Warminski: L’Hélice terrestre (France) (official site)
 Bruno Weber: Bruno Weber Park (Switzerland)
 Isaiah Zagar: Philadelphia's Magic Gardens (US)
 various artists: The Albany Bulb (US)

See also
Visionary environments (Wikipedia category listing)
Saving and Preserving Arts and Cultural Environments

References
John Maizels, Deidi von Schaewen (photo), Angelika Taschen (ed.), Fantasy Worlds, Taschen (2007)
John Maizels (ed.), Raw Vision Outsider Art Sourcebook, Raw Vision Ltd (2002)
John Beardsley, Gardens of Revelation: Environments by Visionary Artists, Abbeville Press (1995)
Roger Manley, Mark Sloan, Jonathan Williams, Ted Degener (photo), Marcus Schubert (photo), John Blumb (photo), Ron Byers (photo), Self-Made Worlds, Aperture (2005)
Leslie Umberger, Erika Doss, Ruth Kohler, Lisa Stone, Sublime Spaces and Visionary Worlds: Built Environments of Vernacular Artists, Princeton Architectural Press (2007)

External links
 SpacesArchives.org website
 Outsider Environments blogspot
 PBS.org: "Off the Map" travelogue menu
 Rawvision.com: Sourcebook
 Shrines.tv website

 01
Visual arts genres
Installation art
Naïve art
Outsider art
Architectural history
Landscape design history